Doryphora is a genus of leaf beetles in the family Chrysomelidae. It includes nine species from Central and South America.

Biology
Doryphora beetles live and feed on vines of family Apocynaceae.

Doryphora reproduce during the transition from the dry to the wet season. Some species are subsocial, with adult females guarding their eggs and larvae from predation.

Species
The genus includes the following species:
 Doryphora bioleyi (Achard)
 Doryphora centrumpunctata Achard, 1925
 Doryphora paykulli (Stål, 1859)
 Doryphora punctatissima (Olivier, 1790)
 Doryphora reticulata (Fabricius, 1787)

References

Chrysomelinae
Chrysomelidae genera
Taxa named by Johann Karl Wilhelm Illiger